Meixian (Hakka: Moiyen), formerly Meihsien, is a district of Meizhou City, in northeastern Guangdong Province, China. The county is an important Hakka settlement and is the ancestral home of many Hakka descendants living in Taiwan.

History 
Its original name was Chengxiang county during the southern Han Dynasty where it was first created, all the way to the Song, Yuan and Ming dynasties, and then renamed Jiaying county during the Qing dynasty. It only obtained the name Meixian in 1911 during the Xinhai Revolution.

Geography 

Meixian almost completely surrounds Meizhou's central urban Meijiang District. This is due to the old urban core of Meixian becoming separated from the bulk of the county in the territorial reorganization following the 1949 establishment of the People's Republic of China, when it was given equal status.

Ethno-linguistic make-up

Meixian is noted for its large Hakka population.

Administrative divisions 
Meixian has administrative jurisdiction over one subdistrict and 18 towns.

 Subdistrict
 Xincheng

 Towns
Chendong 
Shisan 
Meixi
Daping
Shikeng 
Shuiche
Meinan 
Bincun 
Baidu 
Songyuan 
Longwen 
Taoyao
Shejiang 
Yanyang
Songkou 
Nankou
Chengjiang 
Fuda

Culture 
With a majority Hakka population, Meixian, along with Dabu County, is known as the home of Standard Hakka.

References

External links 
 

County-level divisions of Guangdong
Meizhou